Bridge of Alford is a village in Aberdeenshire, Scotland.

Bridge of Alford is situated  near Alford beside the bridge over the River Don. It is on the road towards Strathdon.

References

Villages in Aberdeenshire